FestivaLink presents The Duhks at MerleFest, NC 4/24/09 is the second live album (and the sixth album altogether) by The Duhks. It was produced online at FestivaLink.net, drawn primarily from their live performance at Merlefest 2009. It is notable for several special guest musicians.

Track listing 
You Don't See It — 3:37
Mighty Storm — 4:12
95 South — 3:03
Toujours Vouloir — 4:37
Fast Paced World — 4:02
Ship High in Transit/Magalenha (Papa Senior's) — 6:18
Les Blues de Cadien — 3:09
Whole Lotta Love — 5:47
Death Came a Knockin' (bonus track - MerleFest, NC 4/28/07) — 5:04
Les Blues de Cadien (bonus track - MerleFest, NC 4/28/07) — 2:23
Whole Lotta Love (bonus track - MerleFest, NC 4/28/07) — 4:14

Production
 Recorded at Merlefest 2009

Personnel
Tania Elizabeth - fiddle, backup vocals
Sarah Dugas - lead vocals
Jordan McConnell - guitar
Leonard Podolak - banjo, vocals

Special guests
Casey Driessen - fiddle (track 9)
Abigail Washburn - banjo (track 9)
Scott Senior - percussion (track 9)
John Paul Jones - mandolin (tracks 10-11)
Maddy Gordon

Footnotes
Tracks seven and eight are really two parts of a single set combining Les Blues du Cadien with Whole Lotta Love, which feature Casey Driessen on fiddle and John Paul Jones of Led Zeppelin on mandolin. This combination is particularly obvious when Sarah cuts back to Les Blues du Cadien right in the middle of Whole Lotta Love (at roughly the point where the free-form section would have appeared in the original Led Zeppelin recording of Whole Lotta Love). Also, the song "Magalenha" is similarly interrupted in the middle by "Papa Senior's" before returning to its normal melody.

External links
FestivaLink Page http://www.livedownloads.com/live-music/0,4868/The-Duhks-mp3-flac-download-4-24-2009-Hillside-Merlefest-NC.html

The Duhks albums
2007 live albums